Medical Center is a metro station in Sandy Springs, Georgia, serving the Red Line of the Metropolitan Atlanta Rapid Transit Authority (MARTA) rail system. It serves the Pill Hill neighborhood of Perimeter Center, the location of Northside Hospital (the country's busiest birthplace), St. Joseph's Hospital, and Children's Healthcare of Atlanta at Scottish Rite and DeVry University. North of Medical Center is Dunwoody station and south is Buckhead station. This station's platforms are long enough to accommodate 6-car trains.

The station is located just west of the Fulton/DeKalb County line.  The portion in DeKalb County is currently not developed and is a part of MARTA's portfolio for potential transit-oriented development.  Of note, the station was constructed in 1996 when this portion of Fulton County was unincorporated; Sandy Springs was incorporated ten years later.

Station layout

Parking
Medical Center has 200 daily parking spaces available for MARTA users, which are located at the lower level of St. Joseph's parking deck.  Daily parking (less than 24 hours) is free; long-term parking is prohibited, as the hospital is closed to visitors at night.  In order to limit parking to MARTA users, the parking ticket must be validated inside of the fare gate area to exit the parking deck.

Landmarks and popular destinations
St. Joseph's Hospital
Northside Hospital
Children's Healthcare of Atlanta at Scottish Rite Hospital
 Embassy Row
Perimeter Center business district
 DeVry University

Bus routes
The station is served by the following MARTA bus routes:
 Route 825 - Johnson Ferry Road

References

External links 
MARTA Station Page
nycsubway.org Atlanta page
 Station from Google Maps Street View

Gallery 

Red Line (MARTA)
Metropolitan Atlanta Rapid Transit Authority stations
Railway stations in the United States opened in 1996
Sandy Springs, Georgia
1996 establishments in Georgia (U.S. state)